Anetan may refer to:
 Anetan District
 Anetan Constituency